The 1986 South American U-16 Championship was an international association football tournament held in Peru. The ten national teams involved in the tournament were required to register a squad; only players in these squads were eligible to take part in the tournament.Each player had to have been born after 1 January 1970.

Group A

Argentina
Head coach:  Carlos Pachamé

(N°12)Roberto Oscar Bonano GK 24/01/1970 Club Atletico Rosario Central Argentina

Bolivia

Colombia

Paraguay

Uruguay
Head coach:  Luis Romero

Group B

Chile 
 D.T. Bernardo Francisco Bello Gutierrez.

(GK N°1) Rafael Arturo Contador|Rafael Contador Colo Colo Chile 27/08/1970 (N°2 DF) Rodrigo Perez Salgado|Rodrigo Perez Salgado Audax Italiano Chile 20/03/1971 (DF N°3) Victor Hugo Perez|Victor Hugo Perez Universidad de Chile Chile 18/09/1970 (DF N°4) Luis Gonzalez|Luis Heriberto Gonzalez Soto Audax Italiano Chile 06/08/1970 (MF N°5) Julio Vergara|Julio Homero Vergara Deportes Magallanes Chile 15/09/1970 (DF N°6) Pablo Letelier|Pablo Cesar Letelier Deportes Antofagasta Chile 22/09/1970 (MF N°7) Nilbaldo Ibarra|Nilbaldo Adrian Ibarra Universidad de Chile Chile 11/05/1971 (FW N°8) Leonardo Soto|Leonardo Enrique Soto Colo Colo Chile 09/02/1971 (FW N°9) Ricardo Monje|Ricardo Andres Monje Universidad Catolica Chile 08/06/1971 (MF N°10) Cristian Torres|Cristian Andres Torres Union Deportivo Cobreloa Chile 11/11/1970 (FW N°11) Claudio Troncoso|Claudio Andres Troncoso Colo Colo Chile 31/08/1970 (GK N°12) Rene Molina|Rene Gabriel Molina Universidad Catolica Chile 02/08/1970 (DF N°13) Juan Pablo Villalta|Juan Pablo Villalta Universidad Catolica Chile 30/09/1970 (MF N°14) German Campos|German Patricio Campos Deportes Magallanes Chile 26/08/1970 (DF N°15) Mario Martinez|Mario Alejandro Martinez Universidad Catolica Chile 14/10/1970 (FW N°16) Claudio Betancourtt|Claudio Roberto Betancourtt O Higgins 21/08/1970 (MF N°17) Rodrigo Castañeda / /19 (FW N°18) Marcelo Vega|Francisco Marcelo Vega Regional Atacama 12/08/1971.

Brazil
Head coach:  Jair Pereira da Silva

(N°2)Ademilson Tomaz de Oliveira DF  07/05/1971 Club Atletico Juventus Brazil
(N°3)Antontio Cesar Dos Santos DF 29/08/1970 Sociedade Esportiva Matsubara Brazil
(N°4)Rodnei Claudio Alexandre DF / /19  Sociedade Esportiva Palmeiras Brazil 
(N°6)Renato de Moraes DF / /19 Esporte Clube Sao Bento Brazil
(N°8)Sergio Murilo Ribeiro MF / /19 Sport Club Internacional Brazil
(N°18)William Ramos da Costa FW / / Clube de Regatas do Flamengo Brazil
(N°20)Valdecyr Silva Junior FW / /19 Clube de Regatas Vasco da Gama Brazil
(N°23)Rober Martins Cesar FW / /19 Cruzeiro Esporte Clube Brazil
(N°25)Eduardo Machado Camargo MF / /19 Gremio Porto Alegre Brazil

Ecuador

Peru

Venezuela

References

South American Under-17 Football Championship squads